Highway 782 is a provincial highway in the Canadian province of Saskatchewan. It runs from Highway 11 near Duck Lake to Highway 2 near St. Louis. Highway 782 is about 38 km (24 mi.) long.

Highway 782 crosses the South Saskatchewan River by the St. Laurent Ferry  from Highway 11, near St. Laurent de Grandin.

See also 
Roads in Saskatchewan
Transportation in Saskatchewan

References 

782